Sławomir Olszewski  (born 26 August 1973 in Nowy Sącz) is a retired Polish goalkeeper.

References

External links
 

1973 births
Living people
Sportspeople from Nowy Sącz
Polish footballers
Sandecja Nowy Sącz players
Stal Mielec players
Unia Tarnów players
Widzew Łódź players
Pogoń Szczecin players
MKS Cracovia (football) players
Kolejarz Stróże players
Association football goalkeepers
Ekstraklasa players